Dimitar Ivanov Makriev (born 7 January 1984) is a Bulgarian former footballer who played as a forward

Career

Youth career
Makriev was raised in Levski Sofia's youth teams. In 2002, he signed a contract with Levski's rival CSKA Sofia.

Inter Milan
Few days after signing Makriev, CSKA Sofia sold him to Internazionale. However, he spend the first part of 2002–03 season in CSKA, because Italian Federation froze transfers of foreigners from outside the European Union. After that he played on loan for Swiss AC Bellinzona, Polish Górnik Zabrze and Swiss FC Chiasso. In season 2005–06,he was a part of French Dijon FCO.

NK Maribor
In 2006, Makriev signed with NK Maribor. For two seasons, Makriev earned 48 appearances playing in the Slovenian PrvaLiga, scoring 23 goals.

F.C. Ashdod
In January 2008, Ashdod signed Makriev on a two-and-a-half-year deal. He was given the number 7 shirt. Makriev helped the team save themselves from relegation to the second league in Israel. In 18 games, he scored 11 goals. During the 2008–09 season, Makriev scored 11 goals.

Krylia Sovetov
On 19 May 2011, Ashdod accepted an offer for Makriev from Russian Premier League club Krylia Sovetov Samara. On the next day, he passed his medical and signed a three-year deal that will keep him with the club until 2014.

Levski Sofia
In late August 2013, Makriev returned to Bulgaria and signed a one-year contract (with the option for an additional year) with Levski Sofia.

South China
On 22 August 2014, he moved to Hong Kong team South China AA on a free transfer. However, he had left the club on 10 October 2014 by mutual consent.

Nea Salamina
On 12 July 2015, Makriev signed a contract with Cypriot First Division club Nea Salamina. He appeared in all of Nea Salamina's league matches and scored 19 goals in the 2015–16 season, finishing as the league's top scorer alongside Fernando Cavenaghi and André Alves.

Arda Kardzhali
On 30 July 2018, Makriev signed a contract with the newly promoted Second League team Arda Kardzhali.

Vihren Sandanski
In August 2021, Makriev joined Vihren Sandanski.

Career statistics

Club

International

On 28 March 2009 Makriev received his first call-up to the Bulgarian national team for a World Cup 2010 qualifier against Ireland. A few days later, on 1 April, he scored his first goal for Bulgaria against Cyprus.

References

External links
Profile at LevskiSofia.info

1984 births
Living people
Bulgarian footballers
Association football forwards
Bulgarian expatriate footballers
Bulgaria international footballers
PFC Levski Sofia players
PFC CSKA Sofia players
Inter Milan players
Górnik Zabrze players
AC Bellinzona players
FC Chiasso players
Dijon FCO players
F.C. Ashdod players
NK Maribor players
PFC Krylia Sovetov Samara players
FC Oleksandriya players
South China AA players
Nea Salamis Famagusta FC players
FC Arda Kardzhali players
Ermis Aradippou FC players
P.O. Xylotymbou players
Expatriate footballers in Poland
Bulgarian expatriate sportspeople in Poland
Expatriate footballers in Switzerland
Expatriate footballers in France
Expatriate footballers in Slovenia
Bulgarian expatriate sportspeople in Slovenia
Bulgarian expatriate sportspeople in Switzerland
Bulgarian expatriate sportspeople in France
Expatriate footballers in Israel
Bulgarian expatriate sportspeople in Israel
Expatriate footballers in Hong Kong
Expatriate footballers in Russia
Expatriate footballers in Ukraine
Bulgarian expatriate sportspeople in Ukraine
Expatriate footballers in Hungary
Expatriate footballers in Cyprus
Bulgarian expatriate sportspeople in Cyprus
Bulgarian expatriate sportspeople in Hungary
Bulgarian expatriate sportspeople in Russia
First Professional Football League (Bulgaria) players
Ekstraklasa players
Slovenian PrvaLiga players
Israeli Premier League players
Russian Premier League players
Ukrainian Premier League players
Ligue 2 players
Swiss Challenge League players
Hong Kong First Division League players
Nemzeti Bajnokság I players
Cypriot First Division players